Clube de Desportos da Costa do Sol, commonly known as Costa do Sol, is a Mozambican sports club based in Maputo. It is best known for the professional football team playing in Moçambola, the top division in Mozambican football.

Founded in 15 of October 1955, Costa do Sol won its first title in 1979, the Mozambican league, and today is the club with the most titles won since national independence. They are nicknamed canarinhos (little canaries) for their equipment colour.

Name history
 15 Oct 1955 – 76 : Founded as Sport Lourenço Marques e Benfica
 1976 – 78 : The club is renamed Sport Maputo e Benfica
 1978 – : The club is renamed Clube de Desportos da Costa do Sol

Stadium
The club plays their home matches at Estádio do Costa do Sol and has a maximum capacity of 10,000 people.

Honours
 Moçambola
 Winners (10): 1979, 1980, 1991, 1992, 1993, 1994, 1999/2000, 2001, 2007, 2019
 Taça de Moçambique
 Winners (12): 1980, 1983, 1988, 1992, 1993, 1995, 1997, 1999, 2000, 2002, 2007, 2017
 Supertaça de Moçambique
 Winners (10): 1993, 1994, 1996, 1999/2000, 2000/2001, 2002, 2003, 2008, 2018, 2020

Performance in African competitions
CAF Champions League: 6 appearances
1999 – First Round
2001 – First Round
2002 – Group stage
2008 – Preliminary Round
2008 – First Round
2019-20 – Preliminary Round

 African Cup of Champions Clubs: 6 appearances
1980 – First Round
1981 – Second Round
1992 – Second Round
1993 – Second Round
1994 – Second Round
1995 – First Round

CAF Confederation Cup: 2 appearances
2010 – First Round
2018 – Preliminary Round

CAF Cup Winners' Cup: 6 appearances
1984 – First Round
1989 – Second Round
1996 – Quarter-Finals
1998 – Quarter-Finals
2000 – First Round
2003 – Second Round

Players

First-team squad

Personnel

Technical staff
{| class=wikitable
|-
!Position 
!Staff
|-
| Head coach ||  Horácio Gonçalves
|-
|rowspan=2| Assistant coaches ||  Jossias Macamo
|-
| António Chirindza
|-
| Goalkeeper coach ||  Antoninho Guambe
|-

References 

Costa do Sol
Sport in Maputo
1955 establishments in Mozambique